Woodruff is an unincorporated community in Navajo County, Arizona, United States. Woodruff has a post office with ZIP code 85942.

Woodruff was settled in 1876 by a group of members of the Church of Jesus Christ of Latter-day Saints led by Nathan Tenney and including Tenney's son Ammon M. Tenney.  It was initially called Tenney's Settlement.  In 1878 Lorenzo H. Hatch became the head of the LDS branch there.  At that point it was named Woodruff after Wilford Woodruff.

Demographics

As of the census of 2010, there were 191 people, 65 households, and 49 families residing in Woodruff.

Education
It is in the Holbrook Unified School District. The zoned high school is Holbrook High School.

References

External links
 Woodruff – ghosttowns.com

Unincorporated communities in Navajo County, Arizona
Populated places established in 1876
Unincorporated communities in Arizona
1876 establishments in Arizona Territory